Fotbal Club Politehnica Iași is a Romanian professional football club based in Iași, Iași County. The team has only participated in the 2016–17 edition of the UEFA Europa League.

Total statistics

Statistics by country

Statistics by competition

UEFA Europa League / UEFA Cup

External links
Official website

Romanian football clubs in international competitions
E